Guthrie Hall is a historic mansion located near Esmont, Albemarle County, Virginia. It was built in 1901, and is a -story, seven bay, concrete structure faced in quartz in the Colonial Revival style. It is topped by a standing-seam sheet metal hipped  roof with a copper wash pierced by shed-roofed dormers.  The front facade features a two-story Doric order portico with three dormers that open onto the portico roof.

It was added to the National Register of Historic Places in 1982.

References

Houses on the National Register of Historic Places in Virginia
Colonial Revival architecture in Virginia
Houses completed in 1901
Houses in Albemarle County, Virginia
National Register of Historic Places in Albemarle County, Virginia